Korteweg may refer to:

 Diederik Korteweg, a Dutch mathematician
 9685 Korteweg, an asteroid named after Diederik Korteweg

See also

 Korteweg–de Vries equation